Jaroslav Bašta (born 15 May 1948) is a Czech politician and diplomat. He is a signatory of Charter 77. Between 1998 and 2000 he served in the cabinet of Miloš Zeman as Minister without portfolio. Bašta became the Ambassador of the Czech Republic to Russia in September 2000. He served for five years in Russia, later becoming Ambassador of the Czech Republic to Ukraine, where he worked for three years until stepping down due to health reasons in 2010.

In 2021, he was elected to the Chamber of Deputies for Freedom and Direct Democracy (SPD).

On 10 September 2022, SPD announced it would nominate Bašta for the 2023 Czech presidential election. He was also endorsed by the Tricolour Citizens' Movement and the Workers' Party of Social Justice (DSSS). He finished fifth of eight candidates in the first round on 14 January 2023, with 4.45% of the vote.

See also 
 List of ambassadors of the Czech Republic to Russia

References 

Czech diplomats
Living people
Politicians from Plzeň
Ambassadors of the Czech Republic to Russia
Ambassadors of the Czech Republic to Ukraine
Charter 77 signatories
1948 births
Government ministers of the Czech Republic
Czech Social Democratic Party Government ministers
Freedom and Direct Democracy MPs
Freedom and Direct Democracy presidential candidates
Candidates in the 2023 Czech presidential election
Members of the Chamber of Deputies of the Czech Republic (2021–2025)
Members of the Chamber of Deputies of the Czech Republic (1996–1998)
Members of the Chamber of Deputies of the Czech Republic (1998–2002)